Pirihueico Lake is one of Seven Lakes in Panguipulli Commune, southern Chile. The lake is of glacial origin and it is enclosed mountains of the Andes. It is located in a geological fault that includes Panguipulli Lake and Lácar Lake in Argentina. The lake is drained by Fui River. Pirihueico Lake is used as a waterway due to its elonged shape. It is used mostly by vehicles traveling to or from Argentina by the nearby Huahum Pass. For that reason there is a ferry operating between Puerto Fuy and Puerto Pirihueico in the western respectively eastern extreme of the lake.

References

External links

    Satellital image of Panguipulle Lake

Lakes of Chile
Lakes of Los Ríos Region
Glacial lakes of Chile
Mapuche language